George Ellis may refer to:

 George F. R. Ellis (born 1939), South African cosmologist and mathematician
 George Ellis (poet) (1753–1815), English poet
 George F. Ellis (1903–1972), American cattleman and author
 George Henry Ellis (1875–1898), U.S. Navy sailor during the Spanish–American War
 George R. Ellis (born 1937), author, art historian and director of the Honolulu Museum of Art
 George Edward Ellis (1814–1894), Unitarian clergyman and historian
 George Viner Ellis (1812–1900), British anatomist
 George Washington Ellis (1875–1919), African American attorney, writer, and speaker
 George Ellis (composer) (born 1964), Australian conductor and composer
 George Ellis (athlete) (1932–2023), English sprinter
 George Ellis (silversmith) (1863–1944), British silversmith

See also
 George Agar-Ellis, 1st Baron Dover (1797–1833), English nobleman
 George Ellis Pugh, Democratic politician from Ohio
 Ellis (surname)